Thompson Mill is a historic grist mill located on Seidel Creek in Robeson Township, Berks County, Pennsylvania.  The mill was built about 1816, and is a 1 1/2-story, with basement, stone and frame building with frame extension. The adjacent farmhouse was built about 1850, and is a 2 1/2-story, five bay, stone dwelling.  Also on the property is a contributing stone bakeoven (c. 1850) and the millraces, pond, and dam.  The mill ceased operation in 1950. The mill was built as part of a working farm.

It was listed on the National Register of Historic Places in 1990.

References

Grinding mills in Berks County, Pennsylvania
Grinding mills on the National Register of Historic Places in Pennsylvania
Industrial buildings completed in 1816
Houses in Berks County, Pennsylvania
1816 establishments in Pennsylvania
National Register of Historic Places in Berks County, Pennsylvania